Parirenyatwa is a Zimbabwean surname. Notable people with the surname include:

David Parirenyatwa (born 1950), Zimbabwean politician 
Tichafa Samuel Parirenyatwa (1927–1962), Zimbabwe physician 
Parirenyatwa Hospital in Harare named after Tichafa

Surnames of African origin